Ronald Davidson (born July 16, 1958) is a Canadian former ice hockey player. He played with Team Canada at the 1980 Winter Olympics. Playing on a line with future NHLers Glenn Anderson and Jim Nill, he scored one goal and four assists in six games.

Ron graduated from Queen's University law school in 1982 and then played professional hockey in Sweden, Switzerland, and France for four years before starting his law career in 1986 in Ottawa. He remained active in hockey as assistant at Howie Meeker's hockey schools and later as director of hockey programming for the Ottawa Senators.

References

External links

1958 births
Living people
Canadian ice hockey centres
Ice hockey players at the 1980 Winter Olympics
Olympic ice hockey players of Canada
Sportspeople from Prince Albert, Saskatchewan